Ku, KU, or Kū may refer to:

Arts and entertainment
 Ku (fictional language), a constructed language created for the 2005 film The Interpreter
 Esther Ku, a Korean-American comedian
 Kumi Koda, Japanese pop star nicknamed Ku or Kuu
 In an alien language in the movie Kin-dza-dza!, "ku" replaces most conventional words, with its meaning guessed from context
 In the Discworld, Ku or The Lost Continent of Ku is a satirical parody of Atlantis

Businesses and organizations

Political
 Kommunistisk Ungdom (Communist Youth), the former name of the Young Left (Sweden)
 Young Conservatives (Denmark) (Konservativ Ungdom), the Young Conservatives (Denmark)
 Konstitutionsutskottet, the Committee on the Constitution (Parliament of Sweden)
 Ku Klux Klan, a white supremacy group in the US

Universities

Africa
 Kampala University in Kampala, Uganda
 Kismayo University in Kismayo, Somalia

Japan
 Kyoto University, a national research university
 Kyushu University, a national research university
 Kobe University, a national university
 Kanagawa University, a national university
 Kagoshima University, a national university
 Kagawa University, a national university
 Kumamoto University, a national university
 Kochi University, a national university
 Korea University (Japan), a private university

Asia
 Kabul University in Kabul, Afghanistan
 Kakatiya University in India
 Kandahar University in Kandahar, Afghanistan
 Karnavati University in Gujarat, India
 Karunya University in Tamil Nadu, India
 Kathmandu University in Dhulikhel, Nepal
 Khulna University in Khulna, Bangladesh
 Kuvempu University in Karnataka, India
 Konkuk University in South Korea
 Korea University in South Korea
 Karachi University in Pakistan
 Kasetsart University in Thailand
 Kuwait University in Kuwait
 Kashmir University in Kashmir, India.

Europe
 Catholic University of Eichstätt-Ingolstadt (Katholische Universität) in Eichstätt and Ingolstadt, Germany
 Klaipėda University in Klaipėda, Lithuania
 KU Leuven in Belgium
 University of Copenhagen (Københavns Universitet) in Copenhagen, Denmark

United States
 Kean University in Union Township, New Jersey
 Keiser University, main campus and headquarters in Fort Lauderdale, Florida
 Kettering University in Flint, Michigan
 Kutztown University in  Kutztown, Pennsylvania
 University of Kansas in Lawrence, Kansas or its athletic program, the Kansas Jayhawks

Other businesses and organizations
 Kentucky Utilities, an American electric utility company based in Lexington, Kentucky
 Kuwait Airways (IATA code)

Language
 Ku (kana), romanization of the Japanese kana く and ク
 Kurdish language (ISO 639 (alpha-2) code KU)
 Ku (fictional language), fictional language in the 2005 film The Interpreter

People
 Emperor Ku of ancient China, of Three August Ones and Five Emperors
 Khonds, an aboriginal tribe of India

Science
 K-U ratio, the ratio between potassium and uranium
 Ku band, a band of microwave radio frequencies in the electromagnetic spectrum
 Ku (protein), a protein involved in DNA repair
 Ku, the proposed chemical symbol for kurchatovium (later named rutherfordium)
 KU, Krebs units, a measure of viscosity of paint

Other uses
 , a type of city subdivision
 Kū or Kū-ka-ili-moku, the Hawaiian god of politics, agriculture, war and fishing
 Ku, the original name of the Privilege Ibiza nightclub
 Kose-Uuemõisa, Estonia, a village 
 Mount Ku, Kazakhstan
 Kindle Unlimited, e-book service from Amazon 
 Kū, another form for the Japanese kyū, the number nine, and a term in martial arts

See also
 Coup (disambiguation), pronounced /ku:/
 COO (disambiguation)